The 1990 Humboldt State Lumberjacks football team represented Humboldt State University during the 1990 NCAA Division II football season. Humboldt State competed in the Northern California Athletic Conference in 1990.

The 1990 Lumberjacks were led by head coach Mike Dolby, in his fifth and last year at the helm. They played home games at the Redwood Bowl in Arcata, California. Humboldt State finished with a record of two wins, eight losses and one tie (2–8–1, 1–4 NCAC). The Lumberjacks were outscored by their opponents 205–340 for the season.

In five years under coach Dolby, the Lumberjacks compiled a record of 18–33–2. They had one winning season (1989) and four losing seasons.

Schedule

Team players in the NFL
The following Humboldt State players were selected in the 1991 NFL Draft.

Notes

References

Humboldt State
Humboldt State Lumberjacks football seasons
Humboldt State Lumberjacks football